Joe Fryer is an American journalist working for NBC News. Fryer joined NBC News in 2013 as a part-time correspondent and officially joined NBC News as a full-time correspondent on October 21, 2013.

He reports for all platforms of NBC News including, Today, Weekend Today, NBC Nightly News and MSNBC.

Before joining NBC, Fryer was a reporter for KING-TV the NBC affiliate in Seattle, Washington.

Career
Fryer has worked for KARE-TV in Minneapolis, Minnesota, WTVF-TV in Nashville, Tennessee, WBAY-TV, in Green Bay, Wisconsin and WKYT-TV in Lexington, Kentucky.

In 2014, Fryer won an Emmy with photojournalist Jeff Christian in the category of "Feature News Report." He also won in the writing category for his composite "Fryer's Favorite Features."

References

External links
 Fryer's Facebook account
 Fryer's Twitter account
 Fryer's Instagram account

American television journalists
Living people
1977 births
American male journalists
American LGBT broadcasters
American LGBT journalists
LGBT people from Minnesota
LGBT Christians
American Christians